The Cowasjee family is one of the oldest  families settled in Karachi, Sindh, Pakistan. They owned the East & West Steamship Company, the oldest shipping company in Pakistan, established in 1883.

Background
The Cowasjees are a Parsi Zoroastrian family.
Till his death on 24 November 2012, Veteran newspaper columnist Ardeshir Cowasjee was the chairman of the group and patriarch of the family. Ardeshir Cowasjee was also known as a philanthropist, social activist and a businessman. Some charities Ardeshir donated to are The Citizens Foundation affiliated TCF school in Lyari, Lady Dufferin Hospital, Sindh Institute of Urology and Transplantation (SIUT) and National Institute of Cardiovascular Diseases (NICD)  all in greater Karachi area.

See also
 Cowasjee Foundation
 Cowasjee Group

References

Pakistani families
Pakistani business families
Parsi people